The Black Socialist Society was a British socialist society affiliated to the Labour Party. It was made up of black Labour supporters from 1993 to 2007. It later became BAME Labour.

References

1993 establishments in the United Kingdom
2007 disestablishments in the United Kingdom
Anti-racist organisations in the United Kingdom
Labour Party (UK) socialist societies
Organizations established in 1993